Homeward Bound is a 1923 American silent drama film directed by Ralph Ince and written by Peter B. Kyne, Jack Cunningham, and Paul Sloane. The film stars Thomas Meighan, Lila Lee, Charles S. Abbe, William P. Carleton, Hugh Cameron, and Gus Weinberg. The film was released on July 29, 1923, by Paramount Pictures.

Cast

Preservation
With no prints of Homeward Bound located in any film archives, it is a lost film.

References

External links

Lantern slide at silenthollywood.com

1923 films
1920s English-language films
Silent American drama films
1923 drama films
Paramount Pictures films
Films directed by Ralph Ince
Lost American films
American black-and-white films
American silent feature films
1923 lost films
Lost drama films
1920s American films